Mijiang Township is a rural township in Chaling County, Hunan Province, People's Republic of China.

Cityscape
The township is divided into 18 villages, the following areas: Xiayao Community, Zhongyao Village, Hujia Village, Xinhe Village, Dazhou Village, Duli Village, Hutang Village, Yahuan Village, Oujiang Village, Wulongping Village, Taoyuan Village, Shiliang Village, Ronghua Village, Gongtang Village, Zhangshu Village, Lixin Village, Zhumu Village, and Xingqiao Village.

References

External links

Divisions of Chaling County